Buildings at Risk Register may refer to:

Heritage at Risk Register, maintained by Historic England and formerly known as the Buildings at Risk Register
Buildings at Risk Register for Scotland, maintained by Historic Environment Scotland
Buildings at Risk Register, or BaR, maintained by SAVE Britain's Heritage.